Yang Feifei (born 5 October 1997) is a Chinese rugby sevens player. She competed in the women's tournament at the 2020 Summer Olympics.

References

External links
 

1997 births
Living people
Female rugby sevens players
Olympic rugby sevens players of China
Rugby sevens players at the 2020 Summer Olympics
Sportspeople from Jinan
Rugby sevens players at the 2014 Summer Youth Olympics
China international women's rugby sevens players